Gal Arel (Hebrew: גל אראל; born 9 July 1989) is an Israeli footballer who plays as a defensive midfielder or a central defender for Hapoel Haifa.

Club career
Arel was born in Kiryat Haim, Haifa. He finished his formation with Hapoel Haifa. On 23 January 2009 he made his senior debut, coming on as a late substitute in a 1–0 away win against Maccabi Ironi Kiryat Ata.

On 22 August 2009 Arel made his Premier League debut, again from the bench in a 2–1 success at Maccabi Netanya; he also scored the winner in the 80th minute. He was regularly used during the following four full seasons, with his side always avoiding relegation.

On 22 July 2013 Arel signed a four-year deal with fellow league team Hapoel Be'er Sheva. Regularly used during his first season, he lost his space in his second, being loaned to Hapoel Petah Tikva in January 2015.

On 1 August 2015, already as a free agent, Arel joined Gimnàstic de Tarragona, signing a two-year deal with the club after impressing on a trial. On 1 February of the following year, after being rarely used, he rescinded his link.

Honours
Hapoel Haifa
Liga Leumit: 2008–09
Toto Cup: 2012–13
Israel State Cup: 2017–18

Hapoel Be'er Sheva
Israeli Premier League: 2013–14 Runner-up

References

External links

1989 births
Living people
Israeli footballers
Hapoel Haifa F.C. players
Hapoel Be'er Sheva F.C. players
Hapoel Petah Tikva F.C. players
Gimnàstic de Tarragona footballers
Zawisza Bydgoszcz players
Hapoel Ra'anana A.F.C. players
Hapoel Acre F.C. players
Liga Leumit players
Israeli Premier League players
Segunda División players
Footballers from Haifa
Israeli expatriate footballers
Expatriate footballers in Spain
Expatriate footballers in Poland
Israeli expatriate sportspeople in Spain
Israeli expatriate sportspeople in Poland
Association football midfielders